"The Paradise Suite" is an episode of the TV series Armchair Theatre, produced by ABC Weekend TV for the British ITV network. It was inspired by the death of Marilyn Monroe.

Plot
Film star Lena Roland stays in the Paradise Suite and yearns for love.

References

External links

1963 television plays
Films directed by Philip Saville
Armchair Theatre
Television shows produced by ABC Weekend TV